A higher lending charge (HLC) is a charge made by mortgage lenders in the UK when the loan-to-value ratio of a mortgage is higher than they are prepared to accept at standard rates.

Typically, HLCs are applied to loans in excess of 90% of the property value although, until the 1990s, the limit was usually 75%.

A number of mortgage lenders do not charge HLCs.  They avoid this by either restricting the availability of their mortgages to lower loan-to-value ratios, or charging higher rates on loans with a higher loan-to-value.  Differential pricing of this nature is also referred to as "pricing for risk".

See also 
UK mortgage terminology
Mortgage loan
Remortgage
Subprime mortgage lending

Mortgage industry of the United Kingdom